William Earl Hauser (1896 – ), also known as Mike Hauser, was an American football player. He played professional football for the Dayton Triangles from 1919 to 1920 and for the Cincinnati Celts in 1921. He was one of the early stars for the Triangles. In November 1919, the Dayton Daily News wrote:Hauser was the star of the Triangle line. This clever tackle was in practically every play on his side and when he was not stopping one of the Hoosiers, he was making it an easy matter for some other Triangle to turn the trick."

Hauser was with the Triangles when they joined the newly-organized National Football League (NFL) for the 1920 season. Hauser appeared in a total of 10 NFL games, six of them as a starter. He scored one touchdown for the Celts in 1921.

References

1896 births
Dayton Triangles players
Cincinnati Celts players
Miami RedHawks football players
Players of American football from Illinois
Year of death missing